Ozun Darreh (also Romanized as Ozūn Darreh; also known as Owzown Darreh and Ūzūn Darreh) is a village in Majdabad Rural District, in the Central District of Marvdasht County, Fars Province, Iran. At the 2006 census, its population was 210, in 50 families.

References 

Populated places in Marvdasht County